Swatantra may refer to:
 Swatantra Party, an Indian liberal political party that existed from 1959 to 1974
 Swatantra Bharat Paksh, a liberal party in Maharashtra, India
 Swatantra 2014, fifth international free software conference event, organized at Thiruvananthapuram, Kerala
 Swatantra Dal, a political party in Sikkim
 Swatantra Nepali, a Nepali language weekly newspaper